The Toronto Central Blues are an Australian rules football club based in Toronto, Ontario, Canada.

History

The club was founded in 2005 by former Guelph Gargoyles players Bruce Parker and Rob Chapman. The club is well-supported, and enjoys an active alumni network.

In 2008 the Blues finished 5th and qualified for finals for the first time in the club's brief history. The Blues would go on to defeat the Guelph Gargoyles in Round 1, but experienced defeat in the Preliminary Final at the hand of the Broadview Hawks.

2009 saw the club finish 6th at the end of the regular season to make it into the Finals for the 2nd consecutive season. The club managed to once again surprise their opponent (Toronto Dingos) to easily win their first Final, only to lose to the Etobicoke Kangaroos in the Preliminary Final to end up 4th overall.

Grand Finals 

In 2010 the Central Blues won their first OAFL Premiership versus their downtown Toronto rivals the Toronto Dingos.

In 2014 the Central Blues overcame a 7–5 season to advance to the Grand Final, narrowly losing to the Broadview Hawks.

Women's team 

In 2009 the Central Blues expanded to include Ontario's first organized women's Australian football team. The women's team was started by Bruce Parker and Sherrelle Kelly-Witt.

References

External links
 

Ontario Australian Football League clubs
Australian rules football clubs in Toronto
Australian rules football clubs in Canada
2005 establishments in Ontario
Australian rules football clubs established in 2005